Lucos Cozza (born in Rome, Italy, on 11 April 1921 – 27 June 2011) was a Roman archaeologist.

Born in Rome, Cozza was the son of the sculptor, count Lorenzo Cozza (Orvieto 1877 - Roma 1965), and the grandson of archaeologist Adolfo Cozza (Orvieto 1848 - Roma 1910).

Cozza was a student of Giuseppe Lugli, the author of many scholarly books about Italian prehistory and the topography of Rome; his best-known work is on the Temple of Hadrian. He also wrote an archeological  guide book to Roman antiquities, translated into several  languages.

In 1957 he began the excavation, along with Ferdinando Castagnoli, of the Latin federal sanctuary at Lavinium.

Academic publications
 "Grottarossa (vocabolo Monte delle Grotte). Cisterna ad ogiva in opera quadrata." Notizie degli Scavi 8 s., 1, pp. 101–110, 1947.
 ed. Fontes ad topographiam veteris urbis Romae pertinentes, vol. 1, Liber IV: Muri portaeque aureliani. Rome: Università di Roma, Istituto di topografia antica, 1952.
 "Roma (Via Anagnina, vocabolo “Centroni Grotte”). "Natatio" nell'antica villa detta "dei Centroni"’". Notizie degli Scavi 8 s., 6, pp. 257-283, 1952.
 (with F. Castagnoli). "L'angolo meridionale del Foro della Pace." BCom 76, pp. 119–142, 1956.
 "Ricomposizione di alcuni rilievi di Villa Medici". BdA 4 s., 43, pp. 107–111, 1958.
 "Tivoli (Monte Ripoli). Sito dell'antica Aefula." RendLinc, 8 s., 13, pp. 248–250, 1958.
 Roma antica: guida visiva del centro monumentale. Rome, s.l. ed, 196?.
 (with R. A. Staccioli). Roma com’era e come è: ricostruzioni del centro monumentale di Roma antica. Rome: Vision.
 (with G. Carettoni, A.M. Colini e G. Gatti). La pianta marmorea di Roma antica. Forma Urbis Romae. Rome: X Ripartizione del Comune di Roma, 1960.
 (ed.). Il nuovo Centro Esattoriale di Roma. Rome: Editalia, 1961.
 (with A.M. Colini). "Il compitum del vicus Cornicularius," in Ludus Magnus. Rome: Monte dei Paschi di Siena, pp. 147–150, 1962.
 Epigrafi inedite, in Ludus Magnus (con A.M. Colini), Roma, Monte dei Paschi di Siena, pp. 151–154, 1962
 Ludus Magnus (con A.M. Colini), Roma, Monte dei Paschi di Siena, 1962
 EAA VI, s.v. Mura Aureliane, pp. 797–799, 1965
 A guide to the monumental centre of ancient Rome with reconstructions of the monuments (con R.A. Staccioli, traduzione di J.B. Ward Perkins), Roma, Vision, 1966
 La città di Castro, tutta da scavare (con O. Mazzucato), ArcheologiaRoma, 7, n. 47, pp. 386
 Monumenti all'inferno. Barbarano Romano, ArcheologiaRoma, 7, n. 47, pp. 358–359, 1968
 Pianta marmorea severiana: nuove ricomposizioni di frammenti, Studi di topografia romana, Quaderni dell’Istituto di topografia antica della Università di Roma 5, pp. 9–22, 1968
 Passeggiata sulle mura. Tratto da Porta San Sebastiano ai fornici della Cristoforo Colombo. 21 aprile 1970, Roma, Tipografia Operaia Romana, 1970
 Passeggiata sulle mura. Da Porta Latina a Porta San Sebastiano e Museo delle Mura, fino ai fornici della Cristoforo Colombo. 21 aprile 1971, Roma, Tipografia Operaia Romana, 1971
 Storia della carta archeologica d’Italia (1881-1897), in Carta archeologica d'Italia, 1881-1897: materiali per l'Etruria e la Sabina, Forma Italiae 2 s., Documenti 1, Firenze, Olschki, pp. 429–459, 1972
 Le carte archeologiche strumento indispensabile per la tutela storico-ambientale. Mostra allestita in occasione della Settimana dei Musei, Roma, Soprintendenza alle antichità dell'Etruria meridionale, 1974
 I recenti scavi delle Sette Sale, RendPontAc 47, pp. 79–101, 1974
 Il modello del Tempio di Alatri (con appendice di A. Zevi Gallina), BLazioMerid, 8, n. 2, pp. 117–136, 1975
 Una soluzione del tetto del tempio etrusco, RendPontAc 48, pp. 87–94, 1975
 Le tredici are, Roma, De Luca, pp. 89–174, 1976
 Il restauro delle mura, Roma Comune 1, supplemento al n. 6/7, pp. 1–4, 1977
 Centro circoscrizionale polivalente nel complesso della Fornace Veschi (con E. Tempesta, F. Finzi e G. Ruggieri), in La città dei fili: proposte di riuso degli spazi urbani, Ciampino, Ex cantina sociale, 1980
 Il parco archeologico dell’Appia Antica, in La Residenza imperiale di Massenzio: villa, circo e mausoleo. Contributo al parco archeologico della via Appia Antica, mostra documentaria, Roma, Palombi, pp. 11–12, 1980
 La Residenza imperiale di Massenzio: villa, circo e mausoleo. Contributo al parco archeologico della via Appia Antica, mostra documentaria (a cura di, con G. Pisani Sartorio, G. Ioppolo, R. De Angelis Bertolotti), Roma, Palombi, 1980
 Introduzione (con R. D’Erme), in Carta archeologica d’Italia (1881-1897): materiali per l’agro Falisco, Forma Italiae 2 s., Documenti 2, Firenze, Olschki, pp. vii-xiv, 1981
 La decorazione (con M. Cipollone), in Tempio di Adriano (a cura di), Roma, De Luca, pp. 16–27, 1982
 Notizie storiche. Le mura di Roma. Porta Metronia. Da Porta Metronia a Porta Latina’, in Avanguardia Transavanguardia 68, 77, Mura Aureliane, maggio-luglio 1982 [brochure della mostra], Roma, Tipografia Operaia Romana, 1982
 Le scanalature delle colonne (con A. Claridge), in Tempio di Adriano, Roma, De Luca, pp. 27–32, 1982
 Tempio di Adriano (a cura di), Roma, De Luca, 1982
 Intervento archeologico all’arco di Settimio Severo (et Alii), in Roma Archeologia e Progetto, Roma, Multigrafica, pp. 52–54, 1983
 Le mura di Aureliano dai crolli nella Roma capitale ai restauri di un secolo dopo, in L'archeologia in Roma capitale tra sterro e scavo, Venezia, Marsilio, pp. 130–139, 1983
 Un nuovo ritratto di Cesare, AnalRom 12, pp. 64–69, 1983
 Le tegole di marmo del Pantheon, AnalRom, Supplementum 10, pp. 109–118, 1983
 Zona archeologica del Colle Oppio. Idee per il progetto di un parco (con K. de Fine Licht), in Roma archeologia e progetto, Roma, Multigrafica, p. 115, 1983
 Arco di Settimio Severo’ (con A. Claridge), in Roma archeologia nel centro 1, L’area archeologica centrale, Roma, De Luca, pp. 34–40, 1985
 Colle Oppio (con K. de Fine Licht, C. Panella e R. Motta), in Roma archeologia nel centro 2, La “città murata”, Roma, De Luca, pp. 467–486, 1985
 La grande pianta di Falerii esposta nel Museo di Villa Giulia, OpRom 15, pp. 17–46, 1985
 I resti archeologici visibili nel sottosuolo: necessità di conoscerli e registrarli’, in Roma archeologia nel centro 2, La “città murata”, Roma, De Luca, pp. 308–312, 1985
 Su una pianta dell'area archeologica centrale di Roma (1870 ca.)’, BSR 53, pp. 343-345, 1985
 Sulla pendenza del clivo Capitolino (con A. Claridge e G. Ioppolo), in Roma archeologia nel centro 1, L’area archeologica centrale, Roma, De Luca, pp. 17-18, 1985
 Mura Aureliane, 1. Trastevere, il braccio settentrionale: dal Tevere a Porta Aurelia-S. Pancrazio’, BCom 91, pp. 103–130, 1986
 Mura Aureliane, 2. Trastevere, il braccio meridionale: dal Tevere a Porta Aurelia-S. Pancrazio’, BCom 92, pp. 137–174, 1987
 Osservazioni sulle mura aureliane a Roma, AnalRom 16, pp. 25–52, 1987
 Appunti per villa Esmeade’, BStorArt 31, n. 1-4, pp. 47–52, 1988
 Carta storica archeologica monumentale e paesistica del suburbio e dell'agro romano (con E. Tempesta, X Ripartizione AA. BB. AA. Ufficio Carta dell'Agro), Roma, Comune di Roma, 1988
 Ferdinando Castagnoli, 1917-1988, BSR 57, pp. xi-xiv, 1989
 Guglielmo Gatti, Roma (29-9-1905/2-9-1981)’, in Topografia ed edilizia di Roma antica: ristampa anastatica di tutti gli articoli di Guglielmo Gatti pubblicati dal 1934 al 1979, Roma, "L'Erma" di Bretschneider, pp. vii-x, 1989
 Roma. Le mura Aureliane dalla Porta Flaminia al Tevere, BSR 57, pp. 1–5, 1989
 Sul frammento 212 della Pianta marmorea, JRA 2, pp. 117–119, 1989
 Adonaea nella Pianta marmorea severiana, AnalRom 19, pp. 233–237, 1990
 Passeggiata sulle mura, Roma, Graf 3, 1990
 Sulla Porta Appia, JRA 3, pp. 169–171, 1990
 Trastevere. Viale Trastevere, Mura Aureliane, BA, 1-2, pp. 189–190
 Mura di Roma dalla Porta Flaminia alla Pinciana, AnalRom 20, pp. 93–138, 1992
 L'opera di Thomas Ashby e gli acquedotti di Roma’ (con A. Claridge), in Il trionfo dell'acqua. Atti del convegno "Gli antichi acquedotti di Roma, problemi di conoscenza, conservazione e tutela", Roma, Comune di Roma, A.C.E.A., pp. 13–17, 1992
 Mura di Roma dalla Porta Pinciana alla Salaria, AnalRom 21, pp. 81–139, 1993
 Bibliografia topografica della colonizzazione greca in Italia e nelle isole tirreniche XII, s.v. Nepi, pp. 323–332, 1993
 Mura di Roma dalla Porta Salaria alla Nomentana, AnalRom 22, pp. 61–95, 1994
 Disegni per ... Pratica di Mare: un omaggio a Ferdinando Castagnoli (con C.F. Giuliani, a cura di A. Zarattini), Roma, Soprintendenza archeologica per il Lazio, 1995
 Arthur Dale Trendall (1909-1995), RendPontAc 70, pp. 321–322, 1997
 Mura di Roma dalla Porta Nomentana alla Tiburtina, AnalRom 25, pp. 7–113, 1997
 Riflessioni su Antonio Maria Colini e il suburbio di Roma, RendPontAc 70, pp. 263–265, 1997
 Arvid Andrén (1902-1999)’, RendPontAc 71, pp. 349–352, 1998
 Lo stemma Cozza, in L'abate Giuseppe Cozza-Luzi archeologo, liturgista, filologo: atti della giornata di studio, Bolsena, 6 maggio 1995, Grottaferrata, Monastero Esarchico, pp. 1–3, 1998
 Guido Achille Mansuelli (1916-2001), (con G. Sassatelli e D. Scagliarini), RendPontAc 73, pp. 339–350, 2000
 Adolfo Cozza (con P. Tamburini e C. Benocci), Orvieto, Fondazione Cassa di Risparmio di Orvieto, Perugia, Quattroemme, 2002
 Navalia (con P.L. Tucci), ArchCl, n.s. 7, 57, pp. 175–202, 2006
 Mura di Roma dalla Porta Latina all'Appia, BSR 76, pp. 99–154, 2008
 La Porta Asinaria in un disegno del XVI secolo, RendPontAc 81, pp. 607–611, 2009
 Robert Coates-Stephens, Lavinia Cozza, and Lucos Cozza. Lexicon topographicum urbis Romae. Supplementum VII, scritti in onore di Lvcos Cozza. Rome: Edizioni Quasar, 2014. .
 Adolfo Cozza by P Tamburini; Carla Benocci; Lucos Cozza Luzi: Ponte San Giovanni, Perugia : Quattroemme, ©2002.
L'abate Giuseppe Cozza-Luzi : archeologo, liturgista, filologo : atti della giornata di studio, Bolsena, 6 maggio 1995 
 Studi di topografia romana in onore di Antonio M. Colini in occasione del suo 65e anno. by Antonio Maria Colini : Roma : De Luca, 1968.
 Disegni per ... Pratica di Mare: un omaggio a Ferdinando Castagnoli by Cairoli Fulvio Giuliani; Ferdinando Castagnoli; Lucos Cozza; Annalisa Zarattini; Italy. Soprintendenza archeologica per il Lazio Roma : Soprintendenza archeologica per il Lazio, 1995.

Guidebooks

 Visual guide to the monumental centre by Lucos Cozza Rome : Vision, [195-?]
Published also in German as: Rom wie es war und wie es ist : illustrierter Führer durch Rom : einst und jetzt by Lucos Cozza; Romolo A Staccioli  Roma : Vision Verlag, 1955.
Published also in French as: Guide avec reconstructions des principaux monuments de l'ancienne Rome.  by Lucos Cozza; Romolo Augusto Staccioli; Paolo C Ianni Roma : Vision, 196-?

Necrology
Paolo Sommella - Lavinia Cozza, Un ritratto di Lucos, in Unione internazionale degli istituti di Archeologia Storia e Storia dell’Arte in Roma, Annuario 2012-2013, n. 54, pagg. 477-481.
F. Cairoli Giuliani, Lucos Cozza Luzi (1921 - 2011) in Atti della Pontificia Accademia romana di archeologia. Rendiconti LXXXIV, 2013, serie III, pag 587.

References

Italian archaeologists
1921 births
2011 deaths